Eleorchis, abbreviated Elo in trade journals, is a genus of terrestrial orchids (family Orchidaceae). , it contains only one recognized species, Eleorchis japonica, native to Japan and to the Kuril Islands.

References

External links
 
 

Arethusinae
Monotypic Epidendroideae genera
Arethuseae genera
Orchids of Japan
Orchids of Russia